Murat is a French surname and Turkish male given name, derived from the Arabic Murad. Its Arabic meaning can be translated roughly into "wanted", "desired", "wished for", "yearned", or "goal". 

It may refer to:

Given name
Murat Aitkhozhin (1939–1987), Kazakh-Soviet biologist, Deputy of the Supreme Soviet of the USSR
Murat Akça (born 1990), Turkish footballer
Murat Akhedzhak (1962–2010), Russian politician
 Murat Akyüz (born 1981), Turkish footballer
 Murat Bardakçı (born 1955), Turkish journalist
 Murat Başesgioğlu (born 1955), Turkish politician and MP for Kastamonu
 Murat Belge (born 1943), Turkish liberal intellectual, academic, literary critic, columnist, and civil rights activist
 Murat Boz (born 1980), Turkish pop singer
 Murat Ceylan (born 1988), Turkish footballer
 Murat Çetinkaya (born 1976), Governor of the Central Bank of Turkey
 Murat Didin (born 1955), Turkish basketball coach
 Murat Direkçi (born 1979), Turkish kickboxer
 Murat Duruer (born 1988), Turkish footballer
 Murat Evliyaoğlu (born 1969), Turkish basketball player
 Murat Gülsoy (born 1967), Turkish writer
 Murat Günak (born 1957), Turkish automobile designer
 Murat Karayalçın (born 1943), Turkish politician
 Murat Karayılan (born 1954), Acting leader of the Kurdistan Workers Party
 Murat Kaya (born 1984), Turkish basketball player
 Murat Kurnaz (born 1982), Turkish former prisoner at Guantanamo Bay
 Murat Önal (born 1987), Turkish-Dutch footballer
 Murat Önür (born 1981), Turkish footballer
 Murat Öztürk (aviator) (1953–2013), Turkish aerobatic pilot
 Murat Öztürk (born 1969), Turkish football coach
 Murat Sözgelmez (born 1985), Turkish footballer
 Murat Torun (born 1994), Turkish footballer
 Murat Turan (born 1975), Turkish para archer
 Murat Ülker (born 1959), Turkish billionaire businessman
 Murat Yenipazar (born 1993), Turkish volleyball player
 Murat Yıldırım (disambiguation)
 Murat Zyazikov (born 1957), 2nd President of the Russian republic of Ingushetia
 Murat Pasha (disambiguation)
 Murat Reis (disambiguation)

Ottoman nobility
 Murad I (1326–1389), Sultan of the Ottoman Empire from 1359 to 1389
 Murad II (1404–1451), Sultan of the Ottoman Empire from 1421 to 1451
 Murad III (1546–1595), Sultan of the Ottoman Empire from 1574 to 1595
 Murad IV (1612–1640), Sultan of the Ottoman Empire from 1623 to 1640
 Murad V (1840–1904), Sultan of the Ottoman Empire from 30 May to 31 August 1876

Surname
 Prince Achille Murat (1801–1847), son of Joachim Murat, planter in Florida
 Henriette-Julie de Murat (1670–1716), French writer
 Jean-Louis Murat (born 1952), pseudonym of French singer Jean-Louis Bergheaud
 Joachim Murat (1767–1815), King of Naples, Marshal of France and Admiral of France under the reign of Napoleon
 Joachim Joseph André Murat (1828–1904), French politician
 Kapllan Murat (born 1962), Albania-born Belgian criminal
 Karo Murat (born 1983), German boxer of Armenian descent 
 Marko Murat (1864–1944), Croatian painter
 Özkan Murat (born 1957), Turkish politician
 Tuğçe Murat (born 1991), Turkish basketball player
 Zeynep Murat (born 1983), Turkish female taekwondo practitioner

See also
 Murat (disambiguation)
 Marat (disambiguation)

References

Turkish masculine given names
Turkish-language surnames